Hampton Inn may refer to:
Hampton Inn, a hotel brand owned by Hilton Worldwide

Or it may refer to specific places named Hampton Inn:

Hampton Inn (New Canaan, Connecticut), listed on the National Register of Historic Places (NRHP) in Connecticut
High Hampton Inn in High Hampton Inn Historic District, NRHP-listed in Cashiers, North Carolina
Many others

Architectural disambiguation pages